Lake Chilton is a natural circular lake within the Avon Park Lakes, Florida, community. It is bounded on all sides by residential streets and houses almost completely surround the lake on the opposite side of the streets. The land immediately surrounding the lake is public land. Lake Chilton is three blocks west of Lake Olivia.

The only activities at the lake are boating and fishing.

References

Chilton
Chilton